Abbotsford motorcycles were manufactured by G.W.Revell of 301 Victoria Street, Abbotsford, Victoria, Australia in 1912 and 1913.

Sources

Further reading

See also
Abbotsford motorcycles (UK 1919)

External links
Abbotsford Motorcycles

Defunct manufacturing companies of Australia
Motorcycle manufacturers of Australia
Motorcycles introduced in the 1910s